Fish Outta Water is the first solo studio album by Chali 2na, a front member of Jurassic 5. It was released on Decon in 2009. It features guest appearances from Talib Kweli, Anthony Hamilton, Beenie Man, Elzhi, and the Marley brothers Damian and Stephen. It peaked at number 44 on the Billboard Heatseekers Albums chart.

Critical reception

At Metacritic, which assigns a weighted average score out of 100 to reviews from mainstream critics, the album received an average score of 70, based on 7 reviews, indicating "generally favorable reviews".

Ryan Drever of The Skinny gave the album 4 stars out of 5, writing, "In a bid to assert himself as a strong, diverse talent all on his own, there are notable stylistic shifts peppered throughout these 15 cuts." Mosi Reeves of Spin stated that "Chali 2na uses his cavernous baritone as another resonant instrument in the mix, while his lyrics, which address police brutality ('Guns Up') and fatherhood ('Righteous Way'), lend subtext for deeper listening."

Track listing

Charts

References

External links
 

2009 debut albums
Chali 2na albums
Decon albums
Albums produced by Jake One
Albums produced by Emile Haynie
Albums produced by Scott Storch